North Twin Lake is a  lake in the town of Phelps, in Vilas County, Wisconsin. It is a recreational lake with sport fishing. Native Americans also exercise their federally protected treaty rights to spearfish on the lake.

History
The lake is mainly a sport fishing lake with muskellunge and bass. Recreation on this lake also includes sail racing.

Native American tribes spear fish in North Twin Lake and elsewhere in Vilas county based on their federally protected treaty rights. The spear fishing activities are often a source of friction between Native Americans and local residents.

See also
 List of lakes of Vilas County, Wisconsin
 List of lakes in Wisconsin
 Wisconsin Walleye War

References

Lakes of Vilas County, Wisconsin
Lakes of Wisconsin
Tourist attractions in Vilas County, Wisconsin